The China railways JS class was a type of 2-8-2 tender steam locomotive manufactured for use on mainline freight trains, as well as for heavy shunting.

History
The JS was developed at the Dalian locomotive works by combining the chassis of the China Railways JF with a new boiler. 1135 locomotives were produced from 1957 to 1965 at Dalian, Qishuyan Locomotive and Rolling Stock Works, Datong locomotive works, and the Beijing 7th Feb works. Dalian and Qishuyan manufactured over one thousand.

A second tranche was produced from 1981 to 1988. 358 were manufactured by Datong from 1981 to 1986. 434 of a revised 'B' specification were manufactured from 1986 to 1988,. The second tranche received numbers starting from 8001.

In total, 1,916 JS locomotives of all types were produced.

In the late 1980s, the Boone and Scenic Valley Railroad of Iowa, USA bought JS-8419 for $355,000.

Numbering 
Locomotives produced from 1957 to 1965 were numbered JS-5001 to JS-6135. Starting at 5001 avoided overlapping the numbers of the various types of JF occupying the 1 - 4100 (approx) range. Locomotives produced at Datong in the early 1980s were numbered JS-6201 to JS-6558; after the introduction of the revised 'B' specification the locomotives were numbered JS-8001 to JS-8423. A small number of locomotives operating outside the scope of the ministry of railways (industrial railways) received different number designations.

Gallery

Preservation

5000 Series 

JS-5001: is preserved at the China Railway Museum
JS-5003: is preserved at Shenyang Railway Museum
JS-5039: is preserved at Beijing Exhibition Center
JS-5301: is preserved at Taiyuan Locomotive Depot, Taiyuan Railway Bureau
JS-5342: is preserved at Weifang Railway Station

6000 Series 
JS-6023: is preserved at China Tiesiju Civil Engineering Group Co.,Ltd
JS-6244: is preserved at Nanchang Fenghuangzhou Park (Now renamed JS-6289)
JS-6499: is preserved at Hainan Railway Museum
JS-6532: is preserved at Nanjing Railway Vacational Technical College
JS-6533: is preserved at Shandong Architecture University (Now renamed JS-5610)

8000 Series 

JS-8010: is preserved at Central South University (Now renamed JS-1953)
JS-8024: is preserved at Jinhua Vocational Technical College
JS-8077: is preserved at Zhengzhou Century Amusement Park (Now renamed JS-8001)
JS-8145: is preserved at Xuhui Riverside Park, Shanghai
JS-8239: is preserved at Gongchangling Iron, Liaoyang
JS-8260: is preserved at Songhu Railway's Jiangwan Station Former Site, Shanghai
JS-8284: is preserved at Liuzhou Railway Vacational Technical College
JS-8297: is preserved at Nanxiang Power Locomotive Maintenance Base, Shanghai Railway Bureau
JS-8316: is preserved at Yuanzhou District NO.6 Middle School, Guyuan
JS-8325: is preserved at Tianjin Railway Vacational Technical College
JS-8328: is preserved at Southwest Jiaotong University
JS-8343: is preserved at Yantai Railway Station
JS-8347: is preserved at Hangzhou Baita Park
JS-8376: is preserved at Liuzhou Locomotive Depot, Nanning Railway Bureau (Now renamed JS-1939)
JS-8401: is preserved at Hangzhou Jiangshu Railway Heritage Park
JS-8406: is preserved at Hangzhou Paradise
JS-8419: is operational at the Boone and Scenic Valley Railroad in Iowa, USA
JS-8422: is preserved at Tianjin Binhai Xinjiayuan Railway Cultural Recreation Street

References

CNR Datong Electric Locomotive Co. locomotives
Qishuyan locomotives
CRRC Dalian locomotives
Steam locomotives of China
2-8-2 locomotives
Standard gauge locomotives of China
Railway locomotives introduced in 1957
Standard gauge locomotives of the United States
Freight locomotives